Bernard Sumner (born 4 January 1956) is an English singer, musician, songwriter, and record producer. He is a founding member of the bands Joy Division, New Order and Electronic.  Sumner was an early force in several areas, including the post-punk, synthpop, and techno music scenes, as well as their various related genres, and was an early influence on the Manchester music scene that presaged the "Madchester" movement of the late 1980s centred on Factory Records and The Haçienda club in Manchester.  

He began his career playing guitar and keyboards for Joy Division.  Following lead singer Ian Curtis's death, the remaining members of Joy Division formed New Order with Sumner taking on lead vocal duties.  His complex electronic compositions became less guitar-driven and more focused on electronic keyboards, synthesizers, and programming throughout the 1980s and 1990s.  He formed Electronic with Johnny Marr in the late 1980s as a creative outlet outside of New Order, which continued after New Order went on hiatus in 1993.  New Order became active again from 1998 through 2006, after which he returned to a more traditional rock context with the band Bad Lieutenant.  He continues to record and perform with the latest iteration of New Order, which reformed in 2011.

Early life
Sumner was born on 4 January 1956 in Broughton, Lancashire, England.

Sumner was educated at Salford Grammar School, before joining Manchester-based animation studio Stop Frame (later Cosgrove Hall Films) as an animator (credited as Bernard Dickin) on Jamie and the Magic Torch.

Career

Joy Division
Sumner was a founding member of Joy Division, formed at Salford in 1976. He and childhood friend Peter Hook both attended the fabled Sex Pistols concert at Manchester's Free Trade Hall on 4 June 1976 and whose music inspired them to perform together. Widely considered one of the most influential bands of the era, Sumner was lead guitarist (his main guitars were a Gibson SG and a custom Shergold Masquerader), as well as playing electronic keyboards and made his first vocal appearance on record singing the chorus of "Walked in Line" on the Warsaw album. In May 1980, after the suicide of its lead singer, Ian Curtis, Joy Division disbanded.

New Order
Sumner and remaining band members Peter Hook and Stephen Morris started a new band named New Order, joined by keyboardist Gillian Gilbert in October 1980. Though Hook, Morris and Gilbert also contributed vocals on some early tracks, Sumner emerged as the band's permanent singer and lyricist, alongside playing guitar and keyboards. Through a series of splits and reformations, the band has released ten studio albums.

Electronic
In 1989, Sumner joined up with former Smiths guitarist Johnny Marr to form Electronic. The Pet Shop Boys' Neil Tennant collaborated on two tracks on their debut eponymous album, providing vocals. Sumner was their singer, guitarist, keyboardist and lyricist.

Bad Lieutenant
Bad Lieutenant included fellow New Order member Phil Cunningham and Jake Evans of Rambo & Leroy. Stephen Morris of New Order and Blur bassist Alex James also performed on the band's debut album. Sumner provided vocals, guitar and lyrics.

Other projects
In 1981, Pauline Murray and The Invisible Girls released their last single "Searching for Heaven", which included a guitar solo by Sumner, although he was not credited in the sleeves of its 7" and 10" edition at the time. In 1983, Sumner co-produced, with Donald Johnson, the single "The Great Divide"/"Love in a Strange Place" by the band Foreign Press. Foreign Press (aka Emergency) had had a long history with Sumner through both Joy Division and New Order.

In 1990, he worked with former Factory Records label mates A Certain Ratio, remixing their song "Won't Stop Loving You". He has also recorded tracks with fellow Mancunians 808 State and Sub Sub. Sumner appeared as guest singer and guitarist (alongside Primal Scream's Bobby Gillespie) on The Chemical Brothers' 1999 album Surrender, on the track "Out of Control"; and in a 2005 Chemical Brothers show at the Brixton Academy, Sumner appeared live onstage as a special guest on this track. He has also lent vocals and guitar to a track ("Miracle Cure") on German trance outfit Blank & Jones 2008 release, "The Logic of Pleasure". Sumner also appeared on the Primal Scream track "Shoot Speed Kill Light" from their 2000 album XTRMNTR.

He has produced several remixes for tracks such as Technotronic's "Rockin' Over the Beat" (which was featured in the Teenage Mutant Ninja Turtles III soundtrack) and served as a record producer and/or songwriter for other Factory Records acts including Happy Mondays (whose second single, "Freaky Dancin'," he produced in 1986), Shark Vegas, Abecedarians, 52nd Street and Section 25.

In 2020, Sumner collaborated with composer/producer Zachery Allan Starkey on two singles, “Force” and “Fear City”, which were recorded for Starkey’s solo album, FEAR CITY, released in April 2020. Based in New York City, Starkey opened for New Order during the Music Complete Tour in 2016/2017, after which he and Sumner began to discuss a collaboration. Starkey and Sumner co-produced “Force” and “Fear City”, and Sumner provided synthesizers, guitar, keyboards, and drum programming on both tracks. The Starkey/Sumner collaborations received positive reviews from critics and were featured in Clash Magazine, The London Times, Under the Radar, Filter Magazine, and Brooklyn Vegan, amongst other publications.

Personal life
Sumner married Sue Barlow on 28 October 1978; they had a son, James (born 1983), before divorcing in 1989. Sumner currently lives with his second wife, Sarah Dalton, and their three children.

Sumner was portrayed by John Simm in the 2002 film 24 Hour Party People and James Anthony Pearson in the 2007 film Control.

Discography

Joy Division

 Unknown Pleasures (1979)
Closer (1980)

New Order

Movement (1981)
Power, Corruption & Lies (1983)
Low-Life (1985)
Brotherhood (1986)
Technique (1989)
Republic (1993)
Get Ready (2001)
Waiting for the Sirens' Call (2005)
Lost Sirens (2013)
Music Complete (2015)

Electronic

 Electronic (1991)
Raise the Pressure (1996)
Twisted Tenderness (1999)

Bad Lieutenant
 Never Cry Another Tear (2009)

Collaborations
Section 25 – "Sakura" (keyboards, 1982)
 52nd Street – Look into My Eyes (synthesizer, production, 1982)
 Section 25 – Back To Wonder / Beating Heart (production, 1983)
 Quando Quango – "Love Tempo" (production, 1983)
 The Durutti Column – I Get Along Without You Very Well / Prayer (production, 1983)
 A Certain Ratio – "I Need Someone Tonite" (synthesizer, 1983)
 52nd Street – Cool As Ice / Twice As Nice (synthesizer, production, 1983)
 Surprize – In Movimento (production, 1984)
 Paul Haig – "The Only Truth" (guitar, production, 1984)
 Marcel King – Reach For Love / Keep On Dancing (synthesizer, production, 1984)
 Quando Quango – 2 From Quando (production, 1984)
 Section 25 – From The Hip (composer, production, 1984)
 Section 25 – "Looking From A Hilltop (Restructure)" (synthesizer, production, 1984)
 Section 25 – "Crazy Wisdom" (production, 1985)
 Shark Vegas – "You Hurt Me" (guitar, production, 1985)
 Paul Haig – "Love and War" (guitar, 1986)
 Section 25 – "Bad News Week" (production, 1987)
 A Certain Ratio – "Good Together" (backing vocals, 1989)
 The Beat Club – "Security (Remix)" (vocals, production, 1990)
 Banderas – "This Is Your Life" (backing vocals, guitar, 1991)
 808 State – "Spanish Heart" (vocals, 1991)
 Sub Sub – "This Time I'm Not Wrong" (vocals, guitar, 1997)
 The Chemical Brothers – "Out of Control" (vocals, guitar, 1999)
 Primal Scream – "Shoot Speed Kill Light" (guitar, 2000)
 Blank & Jones – "Miracle Cure" (vocals, guitar, 2008)
 Hot Chip – "Didn't Know What Love Was" (vocals, keyboards, production, 2010)
 Zachery Allan Starkey – "Force" (guitar, synthesizer, keyboards, sequencer, additional drum programming, production, 2020)
 Zachery Allan Starkey – "Fear City" (synthesizer, keyboards, bass synthesizer, drum programming, production, 2020)

Bibliography
 Curtis, Deborah (1995). Touching from a Distance: Ian Curtis and Joy Division. London: Faber. .
 Bernard Sumner: Confusion – Joy Division, Electronic and New Order Versus the World, David Nolan, 2007
 Chapter and Verse – New Order, Joy Division and Me, Bernard Sumner, 2014

Notes

References

Sources

External links

New Order Online – semi-official website, endorsed by the band

1956 births
Living people
English new wave musicians
British alternative rock musicians
British synth-pop new wave musicians
Male new wave singers
Alternative rock singers
English rock guitarists
Alternative rock guitarists
Lead guitarists
English male guitarists
English rock keyboardists
English male singer-songwriters
English record producers
Joy Division members
New Order (band) members
British post-punk musicians
Electronic (band) members
English tenors
English lyricists
20th-century English singers
21st-century English singers
English male writers
20th-century English writers
21st-century English writers
Ivor Novello Award winners
Music in Salford
People educated at Salford Grammar School
People from Broughton, Greater Manchester
People from Alderley Edge
People from Cheshire